MacMurchy is a surname. Notable people with the surname include:

Gordon MacMurchy (1926–2005), Canadian politician
Helen MacMurchy (1862–1953), Canadian doctor and author
Ryan MacMurchy (born 1983), Canadian ice hockey player